The 2007–08 Reading F.C. season was only the second top-flight campaign in the club's history. The team suffered an extremely poor run of form in January and February 2008, losing a club-record eight league games in a row. The club was relegated on the final day of the season after Fulham's victory at Portsmouth saw Reading finish in 18th place.

Review and events

Pre-season
Reading travelled to South Korea to play in the 2007 Peace Cup. Reading lost to River Plate, won against Lyon and Shimizu S-Pulse, and came second in Group B on goal difference.

In Didcot, a Reading XI won 2–0, followed by a 6–1 hammering of Brentford. Reading went away to Brighton & Hove Albion and won 3–1, then a Reading XI drew 1–1 at a rescheduled game at Tooting & Mitcham United. Reading's final pre-season game was against Wolverhampton Wanderers at Molineux, which Reading won 3–2.

August
A tough start to the Premier League season saw Reading travel to Old Trafford to play Manchester United. Reading secured a creditable 0–0 draw, despite losing Dave Kitson to a red card just seconds after the player had entered the game as a substitute; Kitson was dismissed for a lunge on Patrice Evra.

Reading's first home game of the season was a midweek fixture against reigning Premier League champions Chelsea. Reading dominated the first half and led at half-time through André Bikey's first goal for the club, smashed home after Petr Čech and Steve Sidwell collided in the Chelsea penalty area.  Chelsea scored two quick goals, however, in the second half, to win the game 2–1, and Reading again had a player sent off, Kalifa Cissé, this time for two yellow cards.

The following Saturday, Reading gained a badly-needed win against Everton. Stephen Hunt converted from a looping throw-in in the first-half, and Reading secured a 1–0 victory. In their final league fixture of the month, an injury-hit Reading, without Nicky Shorey and Graeme Murty in defence, lost 3–0 at Bolton Wanderers.

On 28 August, Reading began their League Cup campaign with a 1–0 victory away to League One Swansea City. Reading again played some of the match with only ten men, after Sam Sodje was red-carded in the 58th minute, but Leroy Lita struck the winning goal in extra-time, converting a Dave Kitson cross.

September
Reading fans could have been forgiven for expecting a victory from the opening league fixture in the month at home to West Ham United, having won last season's corresponding fixture 6–0. Two goals from Matthew Etherington, however, helped West Ham to a 3–0 victory, as Reading's defence continued to struggle. Another defeat followed at newly promoted Sunderland, Dave Kitson scoring a late consolation from a Nicky Shorey cross, as Sunderland won 2–1.

Reading returned to winning ways on 22 September, and moved out of the relegation places with a 2–1 home victory over Wigan Athletic, Dave Kitson becoming the first Royal to score multiple times in the season, and James Harper with a late winner. The next league match was an away loss to Portsmouth in an 11-goal thriller, the highest goal scoring game in the history of the Premier League to date. While the two sides were equal at 2–2 early in the second half, Pompey went on to a decisive 7–4 victory.  Benjani scored a hat-trick for the home squad in this wild match, which included a missed penalty by Nicky Shorey and scoring by Dave Kitson, Liam Rosinor, Shane Long and Nicky Shorey (later given as a Sol Campbell own goal).

Again, Reading played one cup fixture in the month. Despite a spirited showing by a number of reserves, they lost 4–2 to Liverpool at home in the Carling Cup third round, with Fernando Torres scoring a hat-trick. John Halls and Bobby Convey scored Reading's goals.

October
Reading began the month with a home game against Derby County on 7 October. In what proved to be a scrappy affair, Reading came out with a 1–0 victory through a Kevin Doyle goal; Derby did not manage a shot on target the whole game.

Next followed an away game against Blackburn Rovers on 20 October after the international break. Reading's defensive frailties away from home showed once again as they went down 4–2. Kevin Doyle netted twice after coming on as a substitute while Benni McCarthy scored twice with Roque Santa Cruz and Tugay Kerimoğlu getting the other two goals for Blackburn.

Reading finished October with a home game against Newcastle United. Reading took the lead courtesy of a 53rd minute Dave Kitson goal but a clumsy Michael Duberry own goal in the 76th minute looked to have rescued a point for the Magpies, however a moment of tactical brilliance by Steve Coppell resulted in the winning goal. Shane Long was brought on in the 84th minute to promptly score the winning goal on his second touch of the ball.

November
Following its victory over Newcastle, Reading travelled to Craven Cottage with hopes of a second consecutive league win for the first time in the season.  A laboured performance, however, saw Fulham win the game 3–1, after Kevin Doyle's second-half equaliser had put the Royals back in it.

On 12 November, Reading hosted unbeaten Arsenal under the Madejski Stadium floodlights, and were soundly beaten 3–1, Nicky Shorey slotting home a late consolation after substitute Shane Long had headed against the bar. The result ended a run of three consecutive home victories, and cemented the five-point gap in the table between Newcastle in 11th (on 18 points), and Reading in 12th (on 13 points).

Reading rounded up November with an away trip to Manchester City, many saw this game as a certain victory for the home team considering both City's home record and Reading's away record.  City took the lead thanks to an 11th-minute goal by Martin Petrov only to be cancelled out just before half time by a well struck James Harper goal in the 43rd minute.  Reading looked set to earn a hard-fought point but their hopes were dashed by a 94th minute Stephen Ireland strike.  This result was Reading's sixth consecutive away defeat as they remained winless on the road.

December
The month of December saw an improvement for Reading.  They met Middlesbrough at home on 1 December; after an entirely forgettable first half, Dave Kitson gave Reading the lead, superbly lobbing Ross Turnbull. But with seven minutes remaining, Middlesbrough's Tuncay headed home Luke Young's cross for his first goal for Boro.  The game concluded with a 1–1, just enough for Reading to stay out of the relegation zone.

8 December saw an impressive and unexpected win for Reading over Liverpool.  With a controversial penalty after Jamie Carragher fouled Brynjar Gunnarsson in the corner of the box, Stephen Hunt put the ball into the back of the goal, with Pepe Reina not standing a chance.  Steven Gerrard eventually equalised after many failed Liverpool attacks before and after from Fernando Torres. A free kick was eventually awarded to Reading following an unsuccessful tackle by Gerrard, which Nicky Shorey floated into the area, and Kevin Doyle headed in. James Harper scored a fine third and Reading, with the help of the post, kept the Reds at bay for the remainder of the match.

Following a 1–1 draw away to Birmingham City, in which Stephen Hunt earned Reading a point with his second goal from the penalty spot in two games. Reading scraped a controversial victory over Sunderland at the Madejski Stadium. Leading through an Ívar Ingimarsson goal, Reading conceded a penalty when Ibrahima Sonko appeared to trip Kenwyne Jones.  In the final minute, Stephen Hunt poked a Shane Long cross towards goal, and Sunderland goalkeeper Craig Gordon appeared to palm the ball away.  The assistant referee gave a goal, however, and Reading celebrated a 2–1 victory.

On Boxing Day, Reading travelled to West Ham, leaving Upton Park with a creditable 1–1 draw. Dave Kitson equalized Nolberto Solano's opener after Brynjar Gunnarsson had been sent off for a two-footed challenge on West Ham's Hayden Mullins.

Reading's final game of 2007 was against Tottenham Hotspur at White Hart Lane, where the teams threatened to eclipse the 11 goals in Reading's match at Portsmouth earlier in the season. Tottenham won the match 6–4, although Reading led three times in the second half with goals from Kalifa Cissé and Ívar Ingimarsson and two from Dave Kitson. Tottenham controversially regained the lead after Jermain Defoe headed home Robbie Keane's saved penalty, Defoe having been two yards inside the penalty area when the kick was taken.

January
2008 started badly for Reading, as Ibrahima Sonko was sent off after only four minutes of a home match against Portsmouth on 1 January, for fouling Benjani in the penalty area. Niko Kranjčar missed the resultant penalty, but Sol Campbell bundled the ball over the line a few minutes later after a mistake from Marcus Hahnemann. Reading failed to make much impact against Portsmouth after that, and the extra work-rate required due to being a man down showed in the second half when John Utaka outpaced Nicky Shorey for a second goal after 66 minutes to give the visitors a 2–0 victory.

Just a week after losing 6–4 to Tottenham Hotspur in the league, Reading had an opportunity to give a better account of themselves in a FA Cup Third Round match at White Hart Lane. Fielding effectively a reserve team, Reading earned a replay at Madejski Stadium through a 2–2 draw and another two goals for Stephen Hunt.

Reading returned to league action at Villa Park, and despite an injury to Michael Duberry, and the absence of Ibrahima Sonko and André Bikey to the African Cup of Nations, Steve Coppell opted to play Brynjar Gunnarsson in defence in first half, and Kalifa Cissé in the second half, despite the availability of reserves team captain Alex Pearce. Reading fell to a disappointing 3–1 defeat to Villa, James Harper scoring a late consolation goal for the Royals.

Soon Reading played Tottenham again in the third round replay at home. Robbie Keane scored the only goal as Tottenham Hotspur went to win 1–0 and go into the hat in the fourth round draw.

Next, Reading played Manchester United at the Madejski Stadium. Despite a spirited performance, Manchester United broke the deadlock on 77 minutes with a goal from Wayne Rooney. In injury time, Cristiano Ronaldo wrapped up the points after a second goal, condemning Reading to their fifth-straight defeat.

Reading then played Chelsea at Stamford Bridge. Chelsea dominated the match and took a deserved 1–0 lead on a 33rd-minute goal from Michael Ballack, despite numerous chances, that was the final score.

February
February started miserably for the Royals. First, they lost against fellow strugglers Bolton Wanderers at home 0–2 with the goals coming from Kevin Nolan and Heiðar Helguson.  After a seventh-straight Premier League loss to Everton, Reading dropped into the relegation zone.

Reading went to Everton trying to get a win. Everton proved too strong and beat Reading 1–0 through a Phil Jagielka goal just after the hour mark.

Reading's next game was at home to Aston Villa. Shorey scored Reading's first goal in five matches in the 90th minute for the Royals, but it was all too late—Villa had scored two goals earlier on in the match through Ashley Young and Marlon Harewood, condemning Reading to 2–1 defeat.

March
March began well for Reading, making a complete turn-around. Their first match was against Middlesbrough at the Riverside, a hard-fought match that seeming looked to finish in a draw. In injury time, however, James Harper scored the winner, making the final score 1–0. The victory took Reading out of the relegation zone and into 14th place.

Reading beat Manchester City 2–0, at home, to make it six points out of six. Shane Long and substitute Dave Kitson scored for Reading.

Reading then travelled to Liverpool, going up 1–0 up after a screamer from Marek Matějovský. Liverpool, however, won the game 2–1 in the end. In their next game, Reading beat Birmingham 2–1, as Bikey scored both goals for Reading, making Mauro Zárate's equaliser trivial. Reading then drew against Blackburn in their final game in March, with Matějovský being controversially sent off for two yellow cards.

April

Reading went to St James' Park to play Newcastle in the Premier League. The Royals were beaten 3–0 with goals from Obafemi Martins in the 18th minute, Michael Owen in the 43rd and Mark Viduka in the 57th. This was only the start of a bad month for the Royals. Reading played fellow relegation rivals Fulham at home. 24,221 fans saw a 2–0 defeat as Brian McBride scored within 25 minutes. The Royals' day was over after Fulham substitute Erik Nevland scored a 90th-minute goal to see the Reading's hopes of staying up getting harder by the game.

Arsenal away was next. The Royals were not on form on the road and it showed. Reading lost 2–0 to the Gunners, with Emmanuel Adebayor and Gilberto Silva scoring. Wigan away was next for the Royals, which finished in a fair 0–0 draw. If Reading lost their next game, they could have been in the drop zone.

May
Reading's goal drought continued into May, as the club slipped into the relegation places following a 1–0 home defeat to Tottenham. Robbie Keane's first-half goal was enough to seal all three points for Spurs, for whom Radek Černý made an important late save from a Liam Rosenior shot.

Reading were officially relegated to the Championship on the final day of the season, despite securing a 4–0 victory away to Derby. Reading's strikers found their form a little too late, as Dave Kitson, Kevin Doyle and Leroy Lita all added to James Harper's first-half goal. Fulham beat Portsmouth 1–0 in their final game of the season to condemn Reading to relegation.

Squad

Out on loan

Left club during season

Transfers

In

Out

Loans out

Released

Trial

Competitions

Overview

Premier League

Results summary

Results by round

Results

Table

FA Cup

League Cup

Statistics

Appearances and goals

|-
|colspan="14"|Players who appeared for Reading no longer at the club:

|}

Starting 11

Goal Scorers

Clean sheets

Disciplinary record

Notes

References

Reading F.C. seasons
Reading